The 1940–41 Primeira Divisão season was the seventh season of top-tier football in Portugal.

Overview

It was contested by 8 teams, and Sporting Clube de Portugal won the championship.

League standings

Results

References

Primeira Liga seasons
1940–41 in Portuguese football
Portugal